Hoseynabad-e Dula (also Romanized as Ḩoseynābād-e Dūlā; also known as Ḩoseynābād, Ḩoseynābād-e Dūlāb, and Husainābād) is a village in Damankuh Rural District, in the Central District of Damghan County, Semnan Province, Iran. At the 2006 census, its population was 338, in 113 families.

References 

Populated places in Damghan County